Likas Stadium (Malay: Stadium Likas) (nicknamed: Rumah Sang Badak) is a multi-purpose stadium in Likas, Kota Kinabalu, Sabah, Malaysia. It is mainly used for association football and athletics and it is located within Likas Sports Complex. It has been the home stadium of Sabah FC since its opening in 1983 and renovated in 2001. Likas Stadium has a capacity of 22,000, making it the 8th largest football stadium in Malaysia in terms of seating capacity.

See also
 Sport in Malaysia

References

External links
Borneo International Marathon Official Website
Sukma IX Sabah 2002

Sabah F.C. (Malaysia)
Football venues in Malaysia
Athletics (track and field) venues in Malaysia
Multi-purpose stadiums in Malaysia
Rugby union stadiums in Malaysia
Sports venues in Sabah